Richard Newcombe may refer to:

 Richard Newcome (1701–1769) or Newcombe, English bishop of Llandaff and bishop of St Asaph
 Richard S. Newcombe (born 1950), founder and chairman of Creators Syndicate
 Richard Newcombe (priest) (1779–1857), Anglican priest